Kate Douglas  may refer to:

Kate Douglas, fictional character in The Big Green
Kate Douglas, fictional character in Without a Trace played by Tamara Braun
Lady Kate Douglas, daughter of David Douglas, 12th Marquess of Queensberry
Kate Douglas (cousin of James I), cousin and protector of James I of Scotland

See also
Katherine Douglas (disambiguation)
Katie Douglas (disambiguation)
Kate Douglas Wiggin